The men's K-2 500 metres event was a pairs kayaking event conducted as part of the Canoeing at the 1992 Summer Olympics program that took place at Castelldefels.

Medalists

Results

Heats
30 crews were entered into the event. The top two finishers from each of the four heats advanced directly to the semifinals while the remaining teams were relegated to the repechages.

Repechages
The 22 crews raced in three repechages. The top three finishers from each of the repechages and the fastest fourth-place finisher advanced directly to the semifinals.

Brazil's intermediate time was not listed in the official report.

Semifinals
The top four finishers in each of the two semifinals and the faster fifth-place finisher advanced to the final.

Final
The final was held on August 7.

The German's margin of victory is the largest in a men's 500 meter kayak event in Olympic history.

References
1992 Summer Olympics official report Volume 5. pp. 135–7. 
Sport-reference.com 1992 men's K-2 500 m results
Wallechinsky, David and Jaime Loucky (2008). "Canoeing: Men's Kayak Pairs 500 Meters". In The Complete Book of the Olympics: 2008 Edition. London: Aurum Press Limited. p. 474.

Men's K-2 500
Men's events at the 1992 Summer Olympics